Emiliano Michael Ghan Carranza (born 5 June 1995) is an Uruguayan footballer who plays for Villa Española as a midfielder.

Club career
Ghan was born in Canelones, and was a Danubio youth graduate. He made his first team debut on 21 August 2014, starting in a 1–3 Copa Sudamericana away loss against Deportivo Capiatá.

Ghan made his Primera División debut on 15 February 2015, playing the full 90 minutes in a 1–0 away win against Racing Montevideo. In January 2016, after being rarely used, he was loaned to Segunda División side Villa Española, for six months.

After achieving promotion to the main category, Ghan returned to Danubio in June 2016. He scored his first goal for the club on 25 September of that year, netting the last in a 3–0 home win against Plaza Colonia.

On 27 January 2018, Ghan and fellow Danubio teammate Jorge Graví joined Córdoba CF on loan for six months, being immediately assigned to the reserves in Segunda División B.

References

External links

1995 births
Living people
People from Canelones Department
Uruguayan footballers
Association football midfielders
Uruguayan Primera División players
Uruguayan Segunda División players
Segunda División B players
Danubio F.C. players
Villa Española players
Córdoba CF B players
Atenas de San Carlos players
Uruguay under-20 international footballers
Uruguayan expatriate footballers
Uruguayan expatriate sportspeople in Spain
Expatriate footballers in Spain